Events in the year 1782 in India.

Events
 Arrival of a French fleet under Admiral Suffren.

References

 
India
Years of the 18th century in India